Menon is a surname. Notable people with the surname include:

Indian

In arts, entertainment, and media

Journalism
Appan Menon (1947–1996), Indian print and television journalist
C. Karunakara Menon (1863–1922), Indian journalist and politician
Chengalathu Kunhirama Menon (1857–1935), Indian journalist
Mini Menon, Indian journalist
Ramesh Menon, Indian author, journalist, and documentary film maker

Literature
Anil Menon, Indian computer scientist and writer of speculative fiction
I. K. K. Menon (1919–2013), Indian writer
Indu Menon (born 1980), Indian writer, novelist, and sociologist
M. K. Menon (1928–1993), Indian writer
Menon Marath (1906–2003), Indo-Anglican novelist
Nalapat Narayana Menon (1887–1954), Indian author
Nivedita Menon, feminist writer and professor of political thought at Jawaharlal Nehru University
Oyyarathu Chandu Menon (1847–1899), Indian novelist
Puthezhath Raman Menon (1891–1973), Indian Writer, President of Kerala Sahitya Akademy, Judge of Kerala High Court
P.C. Kuttikrishna Menon (1915–1979), Indian author, also known as Uroob
Ramesh Menon, Indian author, journalist, and documentary film maker
Ritu Menon, Indian feminist writer and publisher
Sandhya Menon, American young adult fiction author
Sreebala K Menon, Malayali author and filmmaker
Vallathol Narayana Menon (1878–1958), Indian poet
Vyloppilli Sreedhara Menon (1911–1985), Indian poet

Performing arts and film
Aishwarya Menon (born 1992), Indian film actress
Alok Vaid-Menon (born 1991), American writer and performance artist
Anjali Menon, Indian film director and screenwriter
Anoop Menon, Indian film actor, screenwriter and lyricist
Anuradha Menon, Indian television actress and theatre artist
Arjun Menon (born 1987), Indian playback singer
Asha G. Menon (born 1986), Indian playback singer
Balachandra Menon (born 1954), Indian film actor, director and script writer
Bhaskar Menon, Indian music executive
Karthika Menon (born 1986), Indian film actress known by her stage name Bhavana
Biju Menon (born 1970), Indian film actor
Divya S. Menon (born 1987), Indian singer and television anchor
Gautham Vasudev Menon (born 1973), Indian film maker
Gopal Menon (born 1974), Indian documentary film director, producer and cinematographer
Hemanth Menon (born 1989), Indian film actor
Jaya Menon, Indian actress
Kay Kay Menon (born 1966), Indian film, stage and television actor
Lakshmi Menon (actress) (born 1996), Indian film actress
Lakshmi Menon (model) (born 1981), Indian model
Meena Menon (born 1970), Indian voice-dubbing artist and singer
Nithya Menon, Indian film actress and playback singer
P. N. Menon (director) (1928–2008), film maker
Pattikkamthodi Ravunni Menon (1881–1949), Indian actor
Rajiv Menon (born 1963), Indian advertising director, cinematographer, actor and film maker
Ramesh Menon, Indian author, journalist, and documentary film maker
Ravi Menon (1950–2007), Indian film actor
Rejith Menon (born 1988), Indian film actor
Renuka Menon, Indian Malayali film actress
Revathi Menon, Indian film actress and director
Sekhar Menon (born 1980), Indian actor
Sheetal Menon, Indian model and actress
Shweta Menon, Indian model, actress and television anchor
Siddharth Menon (born 1989), Indian Malayalam playback singer and actor
Siddharth Menon (born 1989), Indian Hindi and Marathi film actor
Sindhu Menon, Indian film actress
Sreebala K Menon, Malayali author and filmmaker
Sreevalsan J. Menon, Indian vocalist and composer
Suresh Menon (born 1967), Indian actor, comedian and television personality
Suresh Chandra Menon  Indian actor, cinematographer and film director
Unni Menon (born 1955), Indian film playback singer
Valsala Menon (born 1945), Indian film actress
Vimala Menon (born 1943), Indian dance instructor

Other arts
Anjolie Ela Menon (born 1940), Indian contemporary artist
C. Madhava Menon (1911–1984), Indian painter
T.A.S Menon, Indian artist and former Principal of the Raja Ravi Varma College of Fine Arts Mavelikara

In business
G. A. Menon (1931–2003), Indian businessperson
Jaishankar Menon (born 1956), Indian electrical engineer; developer of RAID technology
P. N. C. Menon (born 1948), Indian-Omani businessman

In government, law, and politics

In government
A. R. Menon (1886–1960), Indian National Congress politician and doctor
Ambat Sivarama Menon (1870–1939), Indian politician
C. Achutha Menon (1913–1991), former Chief Minister of Kerala
C. Karunakara Menon (1863–1922), Indian journalist and politician
C. P. Karunakara Menon (1891–1976), Indian civil servant and administrator
K. P. S. Menon (senior) (1898–1982), Indian civil servant
Lakshmi N. Menon (1899–1994), former Deputy Foreign Minister of India
Leela Damodara Menon (born 1923), Indian politician
M. G. Ramachandran (1917–1987), actor and previous Chief Minister of Tamil Nadu
M. G. K. Menon (born 1928), Indian physicist and policymaker
Muthal Puredath Murlidhar Menon, Indian diplomat
N. Gopala Menon, Indian lawyer and politician
P. N. Menon (diplomat) (1920–1975), Indian Ambassador to Greece and Yugoslavia
P. Narayana Menon, Indian lawyer, politician and administrator
Panampilly Govinda Menon (1906–1970), Indian politician, lawyer, and freedom fighter
Shivshankar Menon (born 1949), Indian National Security Advisor
T. Govindan Menon (born 1823), Indian civil servant and administrator
T. Sankunni Menon (1820–1881), Indian civil servant and administrator
V. K. Krishna Menon (1896–1974), former Defence Minister of India
V. P. Menon (1893–1965), Indian civil servant; played a vital role in the integration of India
Vinod C. Menon, member of the National Disaster Management Authority of India

Social activists
K. P. K. Menon, Indian lawyer and political activist
K. P. Karunakara Menon (1930–2002), Indian social activist; former president of the Nair Service Society
K. P. Kesava Menon (1886–1978), Indian independence activist
Mukundan C. Menon, Indian human rights activist
Panampilly Govinda Menon (1906–1970), Indian politician, lawyer, and freedom fighter
V. Viswanatha Menon, Indian communist political activist

In science and academia
A. Sreedhara Menon (1925–2010), Indian historian
Anand Menon, Professor of European Politics and Foreign Affairs at King's College London
Anil Menon, Indian computer scientist and writer of speculative fiction
Geeta Menon, Dean of the Undergraduate College at New York University Stern School of Business
Indu Menon (born 1980), Indian writer, novelist, and sociologist
K. Ramunni Menon (1872–1949), Indian educator
M. G. K. Menon (born 1928), Indian physicist and policymaker
M. K. Krishna Menon, Indian gynecologist and obstetrician
Mani Menon (born 1948), Indian-American surgeon
N. R. Madhava Menon (born 1935), Indian legal educator
Nivedita Menon, feminist writer and professor of political thought at Jawaharlal Nehru University
P Kesava Menon (1917–1979), Indian mathematician
R. V. G. Menon, Indian professor of engineering
T. Bhaskara Menon (1898–1948), professor of pathology and principal of Andhra Medical College
Usha Menon, professor of gynaecological cancer at University College London
V. K. Narayana Menon (born 1911), Indian art critic and scholar of classical Indian dance and Indian classical music

In sport
Narendra Menon (born 1946), former Indian cricketer
Nitin Menon (born 1983), Indian cricketer and umpire
Prashanth Menon (born 1977), Indian cricketer
Ramesh Menon (cricketer) (born 1963), Indian cricketer
Renjith Menon (born 1977), Indian cricketer
Sashi Menon (born 1952), Indian former professional tennis player
Satish Menon (born 1969), Indian cricketer

In other fields
Atmananda Krishna Menon (1883–1959), Indian sage, guru, and philosopher
Narayan Menon (born 1944), former officer of the Indian Air Force

French
It has also appeared, less frequently, as a French surname:

Louis François Henri de Menon (1717–1776), French agronomist
Tugdual Menon (died 1560s), French composer

Other nationalities
This surname has appeared in other places:

Aldrovani Menon (born 1972), former Brazilian football player
Harikrish Menon (born 1973), Malaysian singer, songwriter, and record producer
Luiz Cláudio Menon (born 1944), Brazilian basketball player
Rashed Khan Menon (born 1943), Bangladeshi politician
Sundaresh Menon (born 1962), Chief Justice of Singapore and a former Attorney-General of Singapore
Vanu Gopala Menon (born 1960), Singapore civil servant and diplomat, former Permanent Representative of Singapore to the UN

See also
 Meno (disambiguation)

Indian surnames